Fungal Genetics and Biology is a peer-reviewed scientific journal established in 1977 as Experimental Mycology, obtaining its current title in 1996. It covers experimental investigations of fungi and their traditional allies that relate structure and function to growth, reproduction, morphogenesis, and differentiation.

External links 
 

Elsevier academic journals
English-language journals
Monthly journals
Mycology journals
Publications established in 1977